Brokedown Palace: Music from the Original Motion Picture Soundtrack is the soundtrack album for the film Brokedown Palace, released by Island Records on August 10, 1999 (see 1999 in music).

Track listing
"Silence" by Delerium featuring Sarah McLachlan
"Party's Just Begun (Again)" by Nelly Furtado, produced by Brian West
"Policeman Skank" by Audioweb
"Rock the Casbah" by Solar Twins
"Damaged" by Plumb
"Fingers" by Joi
"Contradictive" by Tricky/DJ Muggs
"Leave It Alone" by Moist
"Naxalite" by Asian Dub Foundation
"Even When I'm Sleeping" by Leonardo's Bride
"Bangkok" by Brother Sun Sister Moon
"The Wind" by PJ Harvey
"Deliver Me" by Sarah Brightman
"The Arrest/Darlene Goes Home (Score)" by David Newman

Trivia
The American Alternative band Wild Colonials were asked to record a cover version of the Grateful Dead song "Brokedown Palace" to be used in the film. It was not used due to a problem with sync rights but did appear on the bands film music compilation album Reel Life vol 1 (2000).

References

1999 soundtrack albums
Island Records soundtracks
Pop soundtracks
Rock soundtracks
Drama film soundtracks